= Shadow Matching =

Shadow matching (a.k.a. Shadow mapping) is a new positioning method that improves positioning accuracy of global navigation satellite systems (GNSS) in urban environments. The shadow matching positioning principle was first proposed and the name 'shadow matching' was first introduced by Paul D Groves. The principle of shadow matching combines two commonly known principles together: GNSS signal availability determination using 3D building models and the fingerprinting-like positioning techniques.

The principle of shadow matching is simple. Due to obstruction by buildings in urban canyons, some of the GNSS satellites will be receivable in some parts of a street, but not all of them. Whether each direct signal is receivable can be predicted using a 3D city model. Consequently, by determining whether a direct signal is being received from a given satellite, the user can localize their position to within one of two areas of the street. By considering other satellites, the position solution may be refined further. At each epoch, a set of candidate user positions is generated close to the user's low-accuracy conventional GNSS positioning solution. At each candidate user position, the predicted satellite visibility is matched with the real observations. The candidate position that has the best match between the prediction and the real observations can be deemed the shadow matching positioning solution. This process can be conducted epoch by epoch, so the GNSS user can be either static or dynamic.

== See also ==
- GNSS navigation
- GPS
- Satellite navigation
